Benjamin Gumbs III was a British colonial governor and plantation owner, son of Benjamin Gumbs II. He was Deputy Governor of Anguilla from 1776 until around 1782.

References

Deputy Governors of Anguilla
Planters from the British West Indies
Year of birth missing
Year of death missing